Ronald Rozelle Davis (born February 24, 1972) is a former American Football cornerback for the Atlanta Falcons and the Green Bay Packers. Coming out of Tennessee, Davis possessed excellent 4.45 speed, coverage skills and size for his position.  He started in four out of his first six games for the Falcons, although he struggled making the transition to the pros.  After failing multiple NFL and Tennessee drug tests, he was released from the Falcons. Davis was later picked up by the Packers, who overlooked his substance abuse problems for his pure talent.  Still, Davis was unable to find success and was not resigned once his rookie contract expired. He attempted a comeback with the CFL's BC Lions in 1999, but lasted all of three games.

References

External links
Just Sports Stats

1972 births
Living people
Atlanta Falcons players
Green Bay Packers players
BC Lions players
American football cornerbacks
Canadian football defensive backs
African-American players of American football
African-American players of Canadian football
Tennessee Volunteers football players
People from Bartlett, Tennessee
Players of American football from Tennessee
21st-century African-American sportspeople
20th-century African-American sportspeople